Fiona Easdale (born 11 March 1959) is a British alpine skier. She competed in three events at the 1976 Winter Olympics.

References

1959 births
Living people
British female alpine skiers
Olympic alpine skiers of Great Britain
Alpine skiers at the 1976 Winter Olympics
Sportspeople from Windsor, Berkshire